Thomas Freudenstein (born 28 April 1962) is a German former footballer who played as a midfielder.

References

1962 births
Living people
German footballers
KSV Hessen Kassel players
Hertha BSC players
Association football midfielders
2. Bundesliga players
KSV Hessen Kassel managers